This article lists various Danish football records for the various Danish football leagues and competitions.

Team records
Most Championships: 15
 Kjøbenhavns Boldklub.
Most Cup wins: 10
 Aarhus Gymnastik Forening

Most successful clubs overall

NOTE: *** The Danish Super Cup is now defunct, and has not been played since 2004. 

 Football in Denmark
 Danish national football team
 Danish Cup

Records
Denmark